Mount Cammerer is a mountain on the northeastern fringe of the Great Smoky Mountains, in the Southeastern United States. The mountain is situated on the state line between Cocke County, Tennessee and Haywood County, North Carolina.  The Appalachian Trail traverses Cammerer's south slope and a restored fire lookout at the summit offers panoramic views of the eastern Smokies, Cocke County, and the Blue Ridge Mountains.

Although a narrow ridge connects Mt. Cammerer to a nearby higher knob, leaving Cammerer with a very low topographic prominence, the mountain is clearly visible not only from the surrounding mountains, but from various points in the town of Cosby and along I-40 as it crosses Cocke County.  Mt. Cammerer is a popular hiking destination, especially in Autumn, when the leaves of the trees in the forest around the mountain blaze red, orange and yellow for as far as the eye can
see.

Geology 

Mt. Cammerer is composed of Thunderhead sandstone, a type of rock common throughout the Great Smokies.  Thunderhead sandstone, part of the Ocoee Supergroup, was formed from precambrian ocean sediments approximately one billion years ago.  The Greenbrier Fault, which crosses the mountain's northern and eastern slopes, thrust the Thunderhead sandstone over the Rich Butt sandstone during the Paleozoic era.  Approximately 200 million years, the North American and African plates collided in the Appalachian orogeny, thrusting the rock upward.

One of Cammerer's key characteristics is the outcropping of contorted quartzite rock at the summit.

History 

Mount Cammerer was named for Arno B. Cammerer, Director of the National Park Service (1933–1940) and an instrumental figure in establishing a national park in the Great Smoky Mountains.  Before its renaming, Mt. Cammerer was known as "White Rock," referring to the bright white rocks that burst through the treeline at the summit.  On some North Carolina maps, Mt. Cammerer is called "Sharptop".  At least one story tells of a lightning blast that cut a hole in the summit, leaving a pool of water that attracted ravens.  

Throughout the late-19th century and early 20th-century, moonshining was rampant in the area around Mt. Cammerer, as what was then a virgin wilderness provided the perfect cover for the illegal stills.  Most residents in the area, however, were law-abiding mountain farmers, as described in local resident Mary Bell Smith's In the Shadow of the White Rock.  Ella Costner, designated by the state of Tennessee as the "poet laureate of the Smokies," was born in the area of what is today the Cosby Campground, at the base of Mt. Cammerer.  In 1934, the Civilian Conservation Corps built a camp at the base of the mountain, and constructed most of the trails and overlooks in the area.

The lookout at the summit of Mt. Cammerer was built by the CCC in 1937, using nearby rock and timber (other materials had to be hauled up the mountain).  The tower was manned by a fire ranger until the 1960s, after which it fell into disrepair before being restored in 1996.

Access 

 The quickest route to the summit of Mt. Cammerer is to ascend the Low Gap Trail from the Cosby Campground to the Appalachian Trail at Low Gap.  From Low Gap, it's just over two miles (3 km) to the Mt. Cammerer Trail, which follows the ridge a half-mile or so to the summit.  The total distance from the Cosby Campground to the summit is just over five miles (8 km).

The Lower Mount Cammerer Trail follows the mountain's northern base over a seven-mile (11 km) up-and-down trail before intersecting the Appalachian Trail near Davenport Gap.  Most hikers who use this route make the following loop: Cosby Campground + Lower Mount Cammerer Trail + Appalachian Trail + Low Gap Trail + Cosby Campground.  The Appalachian Trail intersects the Mount Cammerer tower trail along this route.  The total distance, including the tower trail, is appx. .

Multiple hiking trails, horse trails, and walkways intersect at the Cosby Campground, which can lead to confusion.  From the parking lot (near the campground), one path leads east to the Lower Mount Cammerer Trail.  To reach the Low Gap Trail, simply follow the path parallel to Cosby Creek.  Both trails are marked.

A less-common loop follows the mountain's south slope from the Big Creek Campground (Exit 451 on I-40):  Big Creek Trail + Low Gap Trail + Appalachian Trail + Chestnut Branch Trail.

Hiking in the Great Smoky Mountains, more specifically Mount Cammerer, can be hazardous. Early season snowfalls are not uncommon. Always check the weather before making any hiking plans.

References

External links

 Great Smoky Mountains National Park Trail Map - Large file in .pdf format.
 Mount Cammerer - Peakbagger.com
 Mount Cammerer - SummitPost.org
 In the Shadow of the White Rock - Mary Bell Smith's first-hand account of life in the northeastern Smokies in the early 1900s.
 Tennessee fire towers

Mountains of Great Smoky Mountains National Park
Protected areas of Haywood County, North Carolina
Mountains on the Appalachian Trail
Mountains of Tennessee
Mountains of North Carolina
Protected areas of Cocke County, Tennessee
Mountains of Haywood County, North Carolina
Mountains of Cocke County, Tennessee
Tourist attractions in Cocke County, Tennessee
National Register of Historic Places in Cocke County, Tennessee
National Register of Historic Places in Great Smoky Mountains National Park